Jordberga Castle is a manor house in Trelleborg Municipality in the Scania (Skåne) region in southern Sweden.

History

The estate  dates to the 1400s. Jordberga was bought in 1811 by Governor Eric von Nolcken (1763–1834) and inherited by his son Carl Adam von Nolcken (1811–1857) who  had   the main house built in Gothic style under design by Swedish architect Carl Georg Brunius (1793–1869).
Carl Gustaf Stjernswärd (1844–1896) had the main house re-built in 1908. 
It was designed in Art Nouveau baroque  style by Danish architect Henri Carl August Glæsel  (1853–1921).

See also
List of castles in Sweden

References

External links
Jordberga website

Buildings and structures  in Skåne County